Araya Alberta Hargate (born June 28, 1981), better known as Araya A. Hargate or Chompoo, is a Thai actress, model, host, TV personality and cover girl of British descent. Her most notable achievement is her role in Doksom Sithong. She is of English, Lao and Thai descent.

Biography

Early life 
Araya is Eurasian or Luk khrueng. She graduated from Rangsit University with a Bachelor of Arts.

Career 
She rose to fame in 1998 after winning a beauty pageant, Miss Motor Show Contest, and soon became a household name on her hit lakorn or Thai soap opera. At the age of just 17, her first acting role was in a Lakorn by the title Pleng Prai, produced by Channel 7 in 1998.

Apart from acting, Araya is a model. She received FHM Sexiest Actress in Thailand Awards 2007-2010. She is known as a fashionista and High Fashion Queen. She has also an ambassador for L'Oréal Paris and a regular guest at International Fashion Weeks and at the Cannes Film Festival. Later she was a brand ambassador for fashion magazine L’Officiel Thailand at the Shanghai International Film Festival.

Personal life 
On May 6, 2015, Araya married Witsarut "Nott" Rungsisingpipat, her boyfriend known for six years who is heir to a business fortune.

On September 6, 2017, She went to give birth at Bumrungrad Hospital. In the afternoon, she gave birth to a twin son Saifah Rangsisingpipat and  Bhayu Rangsisingpipat

Filmography

Film

Television series

Television program
 3 zaap

Ost. 
Soundtrack
 Dramas :
 Songs :
 Dramas :
 Songs :
 Dramas :
 Songs :

Movie soundtrack
 Movie :
 Songs :
 Movie :
 Songs :

Cartoon movie soundtrack
 Cartoon :
 Songs :
 Cartoon :
 Songs :

Commercial soundtrack
 Commercial :
 Songs :

Music Video 
 1998 Rutua Bang Mai (รู้ตัวบ้างไหม) - Raptor (RS/YouTube:rsfriends) with Joni Anwar
 2000 Chan Kho Thod (ฉันขอโทษ) - Thitima Prathumthip (GMM/YouTube:GMM GRAMMY OFFICIAL) with
 2000  (จดหมายจากพระจันทร์) - Thitima Prathumthip (GMM/YouTube:GMM GRAMMY OFFICIAL) with
 2006  (เหตุเกิดจากความเหงา) - Emotion Town (AnyMind Music/YouTube:Win EmotionTown) with Thana Suttikamul
 2007 Huang (หวง) - Thanapond Wagprayoon (RS/YouTube:rsfriends) with ฤทธิ์ กาไชย
 2007 Purn Sa Nit Kid Mai Seuah (เพื่อนสนิทคิดไม่ซื่อ) - Saranyu Winaipanit (GMM/YouTube:GMM GRAMMY OFFICIAL) with
 2008 Seang Hua Jai Wan Rai Tur (เสียงหัวใจวันไร้เธอ) - Thanapond Wagprayoon (RS/YouTube:rsfriends) with เติ้ล ชรักษ์กานต์
 2008 สมน้ำหน้า (Som Nam Na (It serves me right)) - Patiparn Patavekarn (GMM/YouTube:) with
 2009 Cha Yu Kap Chan Thang Khuen Dai Mai (จะอยู่กับฉันทั้งคืนได้ไหม) - Neung Jakkawal Feat. ETC. (/YouTube:หนึ่ง จักรวาล 1Jakkawal) with Neung Etc
 2010 Pleng kong ter (เพลงของเธอ) - Thanapond Wagprayoon (RS/YouTube:rsfriends) with Somchai Kemglad
 2010  (เหมือนตาย...ทั้งที่ใกล้กัน) - Thanapond Wagprayoon (RS/YouTube:rsfriends) with Somchai Kemglad
 2011 Chiwit Khu (ชีวิตคู่) - Thanapond Wagprayoon (RS/YouTube:rsfriends) with Somchai Kemglad
 2011 La Ai Jai (ละอายใจ) - DJ. Jea Mam (Winai Suksaweang) (werecordsgmm/YouTube:werecordsgmm) with Thanavat Vatthanaputi
 2011 Poo Ying Ngoh Ngoh Tee Yaum Tur Ngai Ngai (ผู้หญิงโง่ๆที่ยอมเธอง่ายๆ) - Panadda Ruangwut (GMM/YouTube:GMM GRAMMY OFFICIAL) with
 2011  (ให้เลวกว่านี้) - Thanapond Wagprayoon (RS/YouTube:rsfriends) with
 2012 Soft touch with your love - Chompoo Feat. ETC. (/YouTube:Lux Thailand) 
 2013 W8 (ร (W8)) - GENE  KASIDIT (จีน กษิดิศ) (Smallroom/YouTube:SMALLROOM) with กษิดิศ สำเนียง
 2015 Sud-Swing Ringo Eto Bump (สุดสวิงริงโก้อีโต้บั๊มพ์) - Udom Taepanich And Thanida Thamwimon (/YouTube:ThaiStandupComedy)

Award

References

External links 
 Araya A. Hargate on Instagram

1981 births
Living people
Araya A. Hargate
Araya A. Hargate
Araya A. Hargate
Araya A. Hargate
Araya A. Hargate
Araya A. Hargate
Araya A. Hargate
Araya A. Hargate
Araya A. Hargate
Araya A. Hargate
Araya A. Hargate
Araya A. Hargate
Thai television personalities
Araya A. Hargate